City of the Sun is an American acoustic post-rock trio from New York City. Their sound is influenced by several genres, including post-rock, gypsy jazz, flamenco, and indie rock.

Biography
Formed on the Upper East Side of New York City in 2011, City of the Sun initially consisted of guitarist John Pita and a vocalist who left the group soon after forming. Guitarist Avi Snow joined in 2012. The group is known to have created their signature sound while busking on the streets of New York. After being seen at one of their many public performances, the group were invited to perform at the 2013 TED conference and have since also performed at regional TEDx conferences. Percussionist Zach Para joined the group in 2013, and in 2014 they released a live EP entitled Live at the Factory. 2014 also saw the group play to sold-out shows at such iconic New York City venues as Rockwood Music Hall, Mercury Lounge, and the Gramercy Theatre. City of the Sun has also opened for a wide array of diverse musical artists such as punk rock icon Marky Ramone, Gregg Allman, Jewish reggae artist Matisyahu, and bluegrass quintet Greensky Bluegrass.

In 2015, the band was signed to Chesky Records and released their full-length debut to the sun and all the cities in between in March 2016. The album debuted at #12 on the Billboard jazz charts.

After completing a European tour in 2017, the band released their Untitled EP, with the track "Firefly" premiering on Billboard.

2020 saw the release of their second full-length album, City of the Sun.

Discography
Studio albums
 to the sun and all the cities in between (2016)
 City of the Sun (2020)

EPs
 Live at the Factory (2014)
 Jefferson St. Sessions (2015)
 Lost Sessions (2016)
 Untitled (2017)
 Chapter I (2019)
 Chapter II (2020)

Singles
 "Time" (2015)
 "While We Are Young" (2017)
 "Ventura" (2018)
 "Under the Same Sky" (2020)
 "The Last Day" (2020)

References

External links

Avi Snow on Instagram

Musical groups established in 2010
Musical groups from New York City
American musical trios
Chesky Records artists
2010 establishments in New York City